Willow is a station on the Overbrook branch of Pittsburgh Regional Transit's light rail network. It is located in Castle Shannon, Pennsylvania. It is a transfer point between the Red Line (serving Castle Shannon, Mt. Lebanon, Dormont, and Beechview) and the Blue and Silver Lines (serving Overbrook, Carrick, Bon Air, Bethel Park and Library).  The station's name was derived from Willow Avenue, the street that runs parallel with and across the light rail. No parking is available at the site and because park and ride commuters can more conveniently reach the nearby Memorial Hall station, Willow almost exclusively serves nearby apartments and individuals switching trains.

History
Willow was opened in 2004, one of eight new platform equipped stations which replaced 33 streetcar style stops along the Overbrook branch.

References

External links 

Port Authority T Stations Listings
View of the newly opened Willow station in 2004
Station from Google Maps Street View

Port Authority of Allegheny County stations
Railway stations in the United States opened in 2004
Blue Line (Pittsburgh)
Silver Line (Pittsburgh)